Alder Springs is an unincorporated community in Campbell County, Tennessee, in the United States.

The community was likely named for wild hazel alder growing near the town site.

References

Unincorporated communities in Campbell County, Tennessee
Unincorporated communities in Tennessee